Ypthima striata, the Nilgiri jewel fourring or striated fivering , is a species of Satyrinae butterfly found in south India.

Description 

George Hampson (1889) gives a detailed description as follows:

References

Fauna of India
striata
Butterflies described in 1888